Sarajevo Summer Law School is a project organized by the European Law Students' Association (ELSA) in Bosnia and Herzegovina.

ELSA summer law schools are organized seven-day international schools on certain topics in science domains, guided by ideas which are helpful to youth in their academic progress and business prospects.

Idea of the project
The idea about the project of Sarajevo Summer Law School came from Darko Dizdarević who was Vice President S&C of ELSA B&H at the moment of its foundation in 2013. The purpose is to expand the knowledge in the area of law through lectures of recognized experts and to gather students from different countries in Europe to exchange their opinions and to create an effective network.

Founders
Beside Darko, other founders of Sarajevo Summer Law School are: Nihad Odobašić, Mirza Hebib, Harun Išerić, Amina Mašović, Enida Šačirović, Ana-Maria Paponja, Nasir Muftić, Ajdina Batalović, Emina Agić, and Muhamed Tulić.

Main ideas which characterize this project are knowledge expansion of students about certain law themes which form the basis of the entire project, education and progressional upgrade of students who participate in the project, linking, simulatenously, students from all over Europe because of networking being the main goal. ELSA summer law schools are held in the summer and gather approximately 40-50 participants. Inspired by this, ELSA B&H decided to start this unique project, with the aim to give a unique opportunity to law students from B&H and the other starters across Europe who are going to participate in this project, then to increase the academic standard in B&H which did not include an opportunity of additional education on this way, and to improve reputation, structure and organization of ELSA B&H.

First Sarajevo Summer Law School

In 2014, ELSA Bosnia and Herzegovina organized the first Summer Law School on the topic Media Law and International Standards on Information Access. This school was the first law school of this type organized by students in Bosnia and Herzegovina. The idea for this project was created as a result of the need for a detailed and clear proposal solution of unarranged domain access to information and abuse of media rights to the detriment of conscientious citizens. The school attracted around 40 students from 15 different countries, who had lectures for seven days (7–14 August) at the School of Economics and Business in Sarajevo. Recognized lecturers and experts such as: MSc Dunja Mijatović (The OSCE Representative on Freedom of the Media), MSc Amer Džihana (Internews BiH), MSc Kristina Ćendić (Internews BiH), Helena Mandić (Communications Regulatory Agency B&H), DSc Marco Bellezza (Associate at Portolano Cavallo Studio Legale), DSc Oreste Pollicino (Bocconi University) and Anja Gengo (University of Sarajevo) attended.

The announcement of the first Sarajevo Summer Law School and promotion of signing a memorandum of cooperation with institutions and non-governmental organizations were reported by many media in B&H of which is important to mention the state television ˝TV Sarajevo˝ and ˝Hayat TV˝ with contributions in television shows about the school, radio station ˝Antena Sarajevo˝ with a contribution in a radio show and ˝Dnevni Avaz˝ as a written media. During the lasting of the seven-day school, the following media were reporting: ˝Antena Sarajevo˝, ˝RSG Radio˝, ˝Klix.ba˝, ˝Fena TV˝, ˝TV Sarajevo˝, ˝Ekskluziva.ba˝, and many web portals of student organizations and civil society organizations. The official websites of all the project partners have set promotional information about the successful realization of the school.

Second Sarajevo Summer Law School

After the success of the first school, ELSA Bosnia and Herzegovina organized second Summer Law School in July 2015 on the topic "Media Law and Role of Media in Armed Conflicts". The focus remains on the field of Media Law, since this domain was highlighted as a focus programme of the ELSA International.

In the existence and development of free democratic society, media has an important role. Its original role as a mere transmitter of information in modern society is outdated. The formation of public opinion is considerably dependent on both the monitoring of information and its presentation in public. The growing power of media is evident and it reveals series of sensitive questions about legislation, such as freedom of expression, the right to information, the right to privacy, the right to honor and reputation, intellectual property rights, etc.

Media law as a contemporary branch of law consolidates a large number of areas of law with radio and television, printed media, Internet and on-line services, various forms of entertainment, advertisements and marketing, as the subject to regulation. The interest of authority in this branch of law is significant since the trust and support of the public are based on transparency and openness of the decision-making process, which is provided by media. The topic of media law is an important and sensitive topic, which is one of the reasons for it being selected as the topic of second Sarajevo Summer Law School. The biggest advantage of virtual communication is reflected in the two-way interactive communication, thus enabling denial of incorrect information. Another inevitable media is social media, a product of web 2.0, which accomplishes a complete democratization of data and information publishing. Nowadays, through social media people have the opportunity to globally affect messages, publish their attitudes, opinions and ideas. Information provided by these sites has had a significant role in activism in recent years. The best example for that is Arab Spring in which these social media were used as the key tool for mobilization, training, forming the opinion and affecting the change. Despite the censorship of media and the fact that the national television was not reporting anything about what was happening, amateur footage of the first riots in Tunisia got on the Internet. Thereby, the whole world was informed about the course of these events, and citizens realized they can turn the power to their advantage. People of the Arab world understood that they are not alone, that there are others going through the same suffering and brutality.

Third Sarajevo Summer Law School

After the second Sarajevo Summer Law School, in the summer of 2016, the third Sarajevo Summer Law School is going to be organized. This year's summer school topic will be completely different from the topics discussed in the previous two years. This year’s theme is "Freedom of Religion in Europe". Freedom of religion is considered by many people and nations to be a fundamental human right. In a country with a state religion, freedom of religion is generally considered to mean that the government permits religious practices of other sects besides the state religion, and does not persecute believers in other faiths.

References

2014 establishments in Bosnia and Herzegovina
Recurring events established in 2014
Summer events in Bosnia and Herzegovina
Education in Sarajevo
Summer schools
Legal education